Naagin is an Indian supernatural fiction television series about shape-shifting serpents produced by Ekta Kapoor under Balaji Telefilms.

The first season aired from 1 November 2015 to 5 June 2016. It starred Mouni Roy, Arjun Bijlani and Adaa Khan.

The second season aired from 8 October 2016 to 25 June 2017. It starred Mouni Roy, Karanvir Bohra and Adaa Khan.

The third season aired from 2 June 2018 to 26 May 2019. It starred Surbhi Jyoti, Pearl V Puri and Anita Hassanandani.

The fourth season was introduced with a new title Naagin: Bhagya Ka Zehreela Khel. It started airing from 14 December 2019. Its telecast was halted from 22 March 2020 due to Covid-19 outbreak and restarted on 18 July 2020 and ended on 8 August 2020. It starred Nia Sharma and Vijayendra Kumeria.

The fifth season aired from 9 August 2020 to 6 February 2021. It starred Surbhi Chandna, Sharad Malhotra and Mohit Sehgal. 

The sixth season premiered on 12 February 2022 and stars Tejasswi Prakash, Simba Nagpal, Mahek Chahal and Shrey Mittal in lead roles.

Series overview

Cast

Season 1

Main
Mouni Roy as Shivanya: A naagin from Sheshnaag clan, Shesha's maternal cousin sister, Ritik's wife.
Arjun Bijlani as 
Sangram Singh: King of Suryavanshi Kingdom, Yamini's brother, Ritik's father.
Ritik/Yuvraj Singh: Prince of Suryavanshi Kingdom, Sangram and his late wife's son, Shivanya's husband.
Adaa Khan as Shesha: A naagin from Kaal Kuth clan, Shivanya's arch rival and cousin.

Recurring
Sudha Chandran as Yamini Singh Raheja: Princess of Suryavanshi; Sangram's half-sister; Ankush's wife; Amrita and Angad's mother; Ritik's half-aunt; one of the five murderers of Shivanya's parents
Manish Khanna as Ankush "Anky" Raheja: Former farmer, Akhilesh's twin brother, Yamini's husband, Ritik's adoptive father, Amrita and Angad's father, one of the five murderers of Shivanya's parents
Sharika Raina as Amrita Raheja: Yamini and Ankush's daughter, Angad's sister, Ritik's foster sister.
Siddharth Shivpuri as Angad Raheja: Yamini and Ankush's son, Amrita's brother, Ritik's foster brother.
Swati Jain as Divya Raheja: Ankush's niece; Viren, Amrita and Angad's cousin; Ritik's foster cousin.
Vimarsh Roshan as Viren Raheja: Akhilesh's son, Ankush's nephew, royal servant of Suryavanshi Kingdom, Chhaya's husband, one of the five murderers of Shivanya's parents
Gunjan Walia as Chhaya Raheja: Viren's wife.
Bhuvan Chopra as Shailesh Mathur: Ramya's husband, Tanvi's father, Arjun's uncle, royal servant of Suryavanshi Kingdom, one of the five murderers of Shivanya's parents
Jennifer Mistry Bansiwal / Karuna Verma as Ramya Mathur: Shailesh's wife, Tanvi's mother.
Puja Sharma as Tanvi Mathur: Ramya and Shailesh's daughter, Ritik's childhood friend and ex-fiancé.
Pranav Misshra as Arjun Mathur: Shailesh's nephew, Tanvi's cousin, Ritik's friend.
Mazher Sayed as Suri: Monisha's husband, royal servant of Suryavanshi Kingdom, one of the five murderers of Shivanya's parents.
Priya Shinde as Monisha: Suri's third wife.
Rajeev Saxena as Katakka Bhairav/Gurudev: Shivanya and Shesha's mentor.
Kamalika Guha Thakurta as Guru Maa: Sorceress-cum-priestess.
Gaurav Gera as Chutki: A fake transgender naagin created by Guru Maa.
Madhura Naik as Mayuri: Shape-shifting peafowl,she was killed by shivanya.
Rajat Tokas as Kabir: Shape-shifting mongoose, Tanvi's former groom and murderer, Amrita's ex-fiancé.
Kaushal Kapoor as Kabir's fake father.
Shahnaz Rizwan as Kabir's fake mother.

Guest
Lavina Tandon as the girl who became possessed by Goddess Kali.
Aashka Goradia as Avantika: A shape-shifting honeybee, queen of Mahishmati Kingdom.
Vishal Puri as Vikram: Avantika's former general and king of Mahishmati Kingdom.
Tusshar Kapoor, Aftab Shivdasani and Gauahar Khan to promote Kyaa Kool Hain Hum 3
Emraan Hashmi, Prachi Desai and Lara Dutta to promote Azhar

Season 2

Main
Mouni Roy as 
Shivanya: A former naagin from Sheshnaag clan, Ritik's wife, Shivangi's mother, Shesha's maternal cousin.
Shivangi: A Naagin from Sheshnaag clan, Shivanya and Ritik's daughter, Rocky's wife, Shesha's niece.
Karanvir Bohra as Rocky Pratap Singh: A naag from Takshak clan, Vasudha and Mahendra Pratap Singh's son, Yamini's adoptive grandson, Shivangi's husband.
Adaa Khan as Shesha/Ruchika: A naagin from Kaal Kuth clan, Shivanya's maternal cousin, Shivangi's aunt, one of the eight murderers of Shivanya.

Recurring
Sudha Chandran as Yamini Singh Raheja: Sangram Singh's half sister, Princess of Suryavanshi kingdom, Ankush's wife, Ritik's adoptive mother, Shivangi's grandaunt, Rocky's adoptive grandmother, one of the five murderers of Shivanya's parents, one of the four murderers of Ritik, one of the eight murderers of Shivanya,
Aashka Goradia as Avantika: A shape-shifting honeybee(Madhumakki), Queen of Mahishmati Kingdom, Shishupal and Vikram's wife, one of the eight murderers of Shivanya, Rudra's murderer.
Kinshuk Mahajan as Rudra: A naag from Sheshnaag clan, friend of Shivangi.
Vishal Puri as Vikram: Avantika's former general, a shape shifting honey bee,king of Mahishmati kingdom, one of the eight murderers of Shivanya.
Kalyani Chaitanya as Kapalika: An evil sorceress, one of the eight murderers of Shivanya.
Indresh Malik as Manav Nikunj: Mansi's brother, Yamini's partner-in-crime, Nidhi's husband, one of the eight murderers of Shivanya.
Pyumori Mehta Ghosh as Nidhi Nikunj: Manav's wife, one of the eight murderers of Shivanya.
Aryan Pandit as Roumil Nikunj: Nidhi and Manav's son, Avni's brother.
Rutpanna Aishwarya as Avni Nikanj: Nidhi and Manav's daughter, Roumil's sister.
Swati Anand as Mansi Nikunj Mehra: Manav's sister, Amar's wife, Sushant and Alia's mother.
Manas Adhiya as Sushant Mehra: Mansi and Amar's son, Alia's brother.
Shirin Sewani as Alia Mehra: Mansi and Amar's daughter, Sushant's sister.
Malhar Pandya as Nishank: A naag from Sheshnaag clan, Shivanya's friend.
Pankaj Vishnu as Anant Bhargava: Ritik's friend, Shivanya's foster brother, Padmini's husband, Gautami and Sapna's father.
Monica Sharma as Gautami Bhargava: Padmini and Anant's daughter, Sapna's sister, Shivangi's foster cousin.
Naazuk Lochan as Sapna Bhargava: Padmini and Anant's daughter, Gautami's sister, Shivangi's foster cousin.
Lalit Bisht as Aditya: Shivangi's former fiancé.
Vishal Bharadwaj as Shishupal: The real king of Mahishmati Kingdom, a shape shifting honey bee, Avantika's first husband.
Manish Khanna as Akhilesh "Anky 2" Raheja: Ankush's twin brother, Viren's father.
Vineet Kumar Chaudhary as Mahish: A shape-shifting bison.
Vindhya Tiwari as Takshika: Former monarch of Takshak clan.
Anjali Ujawane as Uttara: A tribal woman with knowledge of witchcraft.
Rohit Sagar as Mahendra Pratap Singh: Vasudha's husband, Rocky's father, one of the four murderers of Ritik.
Shweta Dadhich as Vasudha Singh: A naagin from Takshak clan, Ritik's friend, Mahendra Pratap's wife, Rocky's mother.
Shagun Ajmani as Tanya: Manjusha and Ranbeer's daughter, Rocky's friend.
Jaineeraj Rajpurohit as Ranbeer: Manjusha's husband, Tanya's father, one of the four murderers of Ritik.
Arzoo Govitrikar as Manjusha: Ranbeer's wife, Tanya's mother, one of the four murderers of Ritik.
Abha Parmar as Mata Tapaswini: Taksha's chief advisor, a skilled sorceress.
Rohan Gandotra as Anshuman: A naag from Sheshnag clan, Shivangi's friend.
Sriti Jha as narrator.

Guest
Arjun Bijlani as Ritik/Yuvraj Singh: Sangram Singh's son, prince of Suryavanshi Kingdom, Shivanya's husband, Shivangi's father.
Arjun Kapoor, Shraddha Kapoor and Vikrant Massey to promote Half Girlfriend

Season 3

Main
Surbhi Jyoti as 
Bela Sehgal: Naagrani of the Sheshnaag clan; Ruhi's new identity, Vishakha's friend, Vikrant's ex-lover, Mahir's wife.
Shravani Sippi: Naagrani of Sheshnaag clan(later on Naagrani of Naag Lok), Bela's reincarnation, Mihir's wife.
Pearl V Puri as:
Mahir Sehgal: Sumitra and Andy's son, Bela's husband.
Mihir Sippi: Mahir's reincarnation, Kanika and Samarjeet's son, Shravani's husband.
Anita Hassanandani as Vishakha: A naagin from Kaal Kuth clan, Bela's friend, Taamsi's mother, Vikrant's wife.
Rajat Tokas as Vikrant: A naag from Nidhog clan, Sumitra's son, Ruhi's ex-lover, Vishakha's husband, Taamsi's step father.

Recurring
Rakshanda Khan as Sumitra: A former naagin from Sheshnaag clan, then became Naagrani of Nidhog clan after being banished for trying to steal the Naagmani. Vikrant and Yuvraj's mother, Andy's wife, Mahir and Kuhu's step mother. She named herself Sumitra after killing Andy's real wife Sumitra who was her lookalike thus obtaining a new identity.
Chetan Hansraj as Andy Sehgal: A business tycoon; Sumitra's husband; Poulomi's unmarried husband; Mahir, Yuvraj, Kuhu, Aditya and Pratham's father.
Pavitra Punia as Poulomi Roy: Andy's mistress, Aditya and Pratham's mother.
Puneett Chouksey as Aditya Sehgal: Poulomi and Andy's son; Pratham's elder brother; Mahir, Yuvraj and Kuhu's half-brother.
Mithil Jain as Pratham Sehgal: Poulomi and Andy's son; Aditya's younger brother; Mahir, Yuvraj, Kuhu's half-brother; Suhani's husband.
Ankit Mohan as Yuvraj Sehgal: An ichchadhari naag; Sumitra and Andy's son; Mahir, Kuhu, Aditya, Pratham and Vikrant's half-brother; Ravi's ex-boyfriend; Bela's ex-fiancé.
Sakshi Pradhan as Raavi Saluja: Yuvraj's former girlfriend.
Kushabh Manghani as Karan: Sehgal family's manager, the first murderer of Vikrant.
Deepali Kamath as Mukti Mittal: Andy's friend, Shekhar's wife, Rehan and Anu's mother.
Naveen Sharma as Rehan Mittal: Mukti and Shekhar's son, Anu's elder brother, Yuvraj's friend.
Heli Daruwala as Anu Mittal: Mukti and Shekhar's daughter, Rehan's younger sister, Kuhu's friend.
Shahab Khan as Sunil Munshi: Sumitra's family's chief accountant.
Aman Gandhi as Daksh Munshi: Sunil's son, Suhani's elder brother.
Charvi Saraf as Suhani Munshi: Sunil's daughter, Daksh's younger sister, Pratham's wife, Bela's friend.
Simran Sachdeva as Kuhu Sehgal: Sumitra and Andy's daughter; Mahir's sister; Yuvraj, Aditya and Pratham's half-sister; RJ's wife; Ruhi's mother.
Rohit Choudhary as Rohit Jaiswal: Kuhu's husband, Ruhi's father.
Rupesh Kataria as Bultu: Yuvraj's friend.
Heer Chopra as Sonal: Bultu's girlfriend.
Melanie Nazareth as Naagrani Maa: An ichchadhari naagin, former queen of Sheshnaag clan, Ruhi and Juhi's mother.
Roopali Prakash as Juhi: An ichchadhari naagin from Sheshnaag clan, Naagrani Maa's daughter, Ruhi's younger sister.
Saptrishi Ghosh as Arvind: An ichchadhari naag from Sheshnaag clan.
Manoj Kolhatkar as Jagmohan Sharma: Naagrani Ruhi's chief advisor.
Mahira Sharma as Jamini: A Chudail; Rehan's supposed girlfriend.
Adhvik Mahajan as ACP Ajitabh Singh: A cop with a witty sense of humor.
Prince Narula as Shahnawaz: A highly skilled sapera. He wanted to marry Bela but was killed by her.
Aly Goni as Vyom: A shape-shifting vulture; Amrita's son; Amit and Rinky's elder brother.
Geetanjali Mishra as Amrita: A shape-shifting vulture; Vyom, Amit and Rinky's mother.
Adish Vaidya as Amit: A shape-shifting vulture, Amrita's son, Vyom's younger brother.
Aditi Sharma as Rinky: A shape-shifting vulture, Amrita's daughter, Vyom's younger sister.
Mreenal Deshraj as Rohini: An ichchadhari naagin from Nidhog clan, Sumitra's younger sister, Alekh's wife.
Amit Dhawan as Alekh: An ichchadhari naag from Nidhog clan, Rohini's husband.
Sangeeta Chauhan as Avi: A stranger who helps Bela, Vishakha and Vikrant to enter Sumitra's house.
Aditi Sharma as Shivli: The girl chosen by Sumitra to marry Mahir.
Khushwant Walia as Raj: Shivli's brother, Mona's husband.
Mala Salariya as Mona: Raj's wife.
Zuber K. Khan as Ritvik: A paranormal investigator, Mahir's cousin.
Nikitin Dheer as Hukum: An evil demon; Taamsi's father.
Krishna Mukherjee as Taamsi: The most powerful and dreaded demoness in the world, Vishakha and Hukum's daughter, Vikrant's step daughter.
Aleena Lambe as young Taamsi
Anjali Gupta as Sarika : Shravani's mother.
Anjani Kumar Khanna as Manish : Shravani's father, Sarika's husband.
Deepak Wadhwa as Mohit Sippi: Kanika and Samarjeet's son, Mihir's elder brother.
Jiten Lalwani as Samarjeet Sippi: Kanika's husband, Mihir and Mohit's father.
Madhuri Pandey as Kanika Sippi: Samarjeet's wife, Mihir and Mohit's mother.
Prachee Pathak as Ambar Sippi: Samarjeet's elder sister, Mihir and Mohit's aunt.
Akash Rawat as Rohan: Mihir and Mohit's friend.
Sumit Wadhwa as Gaurav: Mihir and Mohit's friend.
Sanjay Swaraj as Maha Sapera: Mentor of Shahnawaz, hired by Sumitra to trap Shravani and Vishakha but later was killed by them.

Guest
Karishma Tanna as 
Ruhi: Bela's former name, a naagin of Sheshnaag clan, future Naagrani who was separated from her lover Vikrant cruelly. She was blessed with a new face by Lord Shiva after her real face was destroyed by Yuvi and his friends.
Huzoor: A powerful demoness who can shape-shifting into a snake, Huzoor is Hukum's right hand and Ruhi's doppelganger.
Mouni Roy as:
Shivanya: A naagin from Sheshnaag clan, Shesha's cousin sister, Ritik's wife, Shivangi's mother.
Shivangi: Mahanaagrani of Naaglok, Shivanya and Ritik's daughter, Shesha's niece, Rocky's wife.
Arjun Bijlani as Ritik/Yuvraj Singh: Sangram Singh's son, prince of Suryavanshi Kingdom, Shivanya's husband, Shivangi's father.
Karanvir Bohra as Rocky Pratap Singh: A naag from Takshak clan, Shivangi's husband.
Adaa Khan as Shesha: A naagin from Kaal Kuth clan, Shivanya's cousin, Shivangi's aunt.
Sudha Chandran as Yamini Singh-Raheja: Sangram Singh's adoptive sister, princess of Suryavanshi Kingdom, Ritik's adoptive mother, Rocky's adoptive aunt. She returned to seek Naagmani but was killed by Shivangi.
Kareena Kapoor, Sonam Kapoor, Swara Bhaskar and Shikha Talsania to promote Veere Di Wedding
Avinash Tiwary and Tripti Dimri to promote Laila Majnu
Rajkumar Rao, Shraddha Kapoor and Abhishek Banerjee to promote Stree
Arunoday Singh, Mahie Gill and Nidhi Singh to promote Apharan
Ronit Roy, Mona Singh and Gurdeep Kohli to promote Kehne Ko Humsafar Hain
Shivin Narang as Jai Mittal from the series Internet Wala Love
Jayati Bhatia as Roopa Mittal from the series Internet Wala Love
Neil Bhatt as Ranveer Singh Vaghela from the series Roop - Mard Ka Naya Swaroop
Arjun Bijlani as Deep Raj Singh from the series Ishq Mein Marjawan
Nia Sharma as Aarohi Kashyap from the series Ishq Mein Marjawan
Shoaib Ibrahim as Abhimanyu from the series Ishq Mein Marjawan
Rashami Desai as herself
Drashti Dhami as herself
Ravi Dubey as himself
Avika Gor as herself
Sanjeeda Sheikh as herself
Karan Tacker as himself
Sidharth Shukla as himself
Krystle D'Souza as herself
Gauahar Khan as herself

Season 4

Main
Nia Sharma as Brinda: A naagin from Sheshnaag clan, Manyata and Keshav's daughter, Dev's wife.
Vijayendra Kumeria as Dev Parekh: Vrushali and Aakash's son, Brinda's husband.

Recurring
Jasmin Bhasin as Nayantara: Manyata's adopted daughter; Brinda's adoptive sister.
Rashami Desai as Shalaka: Nayantara's new identity given by Vishakha, Dev's illegal wife; Vishakha's crime partner.
Anita Hassanandani as Vishakha: A naagin from Kaal Kuth clan, Bela/Shravani and Brinda's enemy, Vikrant's wife, Nayantara/Shalaka's crime partner.
Sayantani Ghosh as Manyata: Naagin princess from Sheshnaag clan, Vividha's daughter, Keshav's wife, Brinda's mother, Nayantara's adoptive mother.
Shalin Bhanot as Keshav: Nanabhai and Madhulata's son, Aakash Parekh's friend, Manyata's husband, Brinda's father.
Farida Patel Venkat as "Baa": Aakash, Madhav, Rasik and Khyati's mother; Dev, Rohan, Harsh, Sparsh, Hardik, Lilly, Milly, Manas and Geetanjali's grandmother.
Geetanjali Tikekar as Vrushali Parekh: Aakash's wife, Dev and Rohan's mother, one of the six murderers.
Sanjay Gandhi as Aakash Parekh: Baa's son; Madhav, Rasik and Khyati's brother; Keshav and Mahesh's childhood friend; Vrushali's husband, Dev and Rohan's father.
Manan Chaturvedi as Rohan Parekh: Aakash and Vrushali's son, Dev's brother.
Rakhi Vijan as Ketki Parekh: Rasik's wife; Hardik, Lilly and Milly's mother; Karan's grandmother; one of the six murderers.
Hetal Puniwala as Rasik Parekh: Baa's son; Aakash, Rasik and Khyati's brother; Ketki's husband; Hardik, Lilly and Milly's father; Karan's grandfather; one of the six murderers.
Lakshay Khurana as Hardik Parekh: Ketki and Rasik's son, Lilly and Milly's brother.
Himani Sahani as Lilly Parekh: Ketki and Rasik's daughter, Hardik and Milly's sister, Prateek's ex-girlfriend, Karan's mother.
Parree Pande as Milly Parekh: Ketki and Rasik's daughter, Hardik and Lilly's sister.
Aparna Kumar as Iravati Parekh: Madhav's wife, Harsh and Sparsh's mother, one of the six murderers.
Sikandar Kharbanda as Madhav Parekh: Baa's son; Rasik, Aakash and Khyati's brother; Iravati's husband, Harsh and Sparsh's father, one of the six murderers.
Ankur Verma as Harsh Parekh: Iravati and Madhav's son, Sparsh's brother
Tushar Dhembla as Sparsh Parekh: Iravati and Madhav's son, Harsh's brother.
Swati Anand as Khyati Parekh: Baa's daughter, Manas and Geetanjali's mother, one of the six murderers.
Kunal Singh as Manas Parekh: Khyati's son, Geetanjali's brother
Disha Kapoor as Geetanjali Parekh: Khyati's daughter, Manas's sister.
Mandeep Kumar as Mahesh Sharma: Priest of Parekh family, Aakash's friend, Swara's husband, Brinda's foster father.
Supriya Shukla as Swara Sharma: Mahesh's wife, Brinda's adoptive mother.
Ankit Bathla as Rajat Malhotra: Brinda's ex-fiancé.
Priya Tandon as Kanika Verma: Manas' ex-fiancé.
Kaveri Ghosh as Nanabhai's wife, Keshav's mother.
 Richa Rathore as Priyal Singh: Manas's lover.
Ratnakar Nadkarni as Mahanjay Akappa Sethi/Baba: Manyata and Brinda's mentor.
Sanjay Gagnani as Prateek Raichand: Lilly's ex-boyfriend, Karan's father.
Afreen Alvi as Billy Rathod: Ketki's niece.
Nisha Nagpal as Ghumri: A shape-shifting owl, Brinda's helper.

Guest
Surbhi Jyoti as Bela/Shravani: Naagrani of Sheshnaag clan.
Adaa Khan as Shesha: A bad turned good naagin from Sheshnaag clan.
Hina Khan as Naageshwari: Sarvashreshth Aadi Naagin, the first and the most powerful Naagin, Hriday's lover.
Salman Khan to promote his film Dabangg 3

Season 5

Main
Surbhi Chandna as Bani Sharma: Sarvashreshth Aadi Naagin from Sheshnaag Clan, Naageshwari's reincarnation, Veeranshu's wife. 
Sharad Malhotra as 
Veeranshu Singhania: A cheel (shapeshifting eagle); prince of cheels ; Akesh's reincarnation; Bani's husband.
 Teer Singhania: Veer's twin brother.
Mohit Sehgal as Jay Mathur: Sarvashreshth Aadi Naag from Sheshnaag Clan, Hriday's reincarnation.

Recurring
Ravee Gupta as Chandrakala Singhania (Maarkat): Balwant's wife; Tapish, Veer, Teer and Jay's mother. An evil creature who has both the forms of cheel and naagin.
Parag Tyagi as King of the Cheel Clan/Balwant Singhania: Akesh and Veer, Teer, Tapish's father.
Anjum Fakih as Noor: Bani's friend.
Aishwarya Khare as Meera Singhania: Bani's adoptive sister, Dehek and Mehek's sister, Tapish's fiancée.
Aakash Talwar as Tapish Singhania: Balwant's son, Veer and Teer's elder brother, Meera's fiancée.
Simran Mahendrawal as Naina: A naagin from Sheshnaag clan, Abhishek's wife, a key witness of Noor's death, she died saving Bani's life.
Shourya Lathar as Abhishek: A naag from Sheshnaag clan, Naina's husband.
Anjani Kumar Khanna as Shivayya Sharma: Meera, Dehek, Mehak's father; Bani's adoptive father.
Shivani Gosain as Ritu Sharma: Bani's adoptive mother; Mehek, Dehek and Meera's mother.
Aahna Sharma as Dehek Sharma: Bani's adoptive sister, Mehek's and Meera's sister.
Khushi Chaudhary as Mehak Sharma: Bani's adoptive sister, Meera and Dehek's sister.
Gaurav Wadhwa as Gautam Mathur: Jay's brother.
Mehak Ghai as Aarohi Mathur: Jay's sister.
Kajal Pisal as Adhira Mathur: Jay's paternal aunt.
Kiran Bhargava as Dolly Mathur: Jay's grandmother.
Dinesh Mehta as Pawan Singhania: Balwant's younger brother; Daksh, Monil and Ponky's father.
Utkarsh Gupta as Pankaj "Ponky" Singhania: Pawan's son, Monil and Daksh's brother, Veer's cousin.
Anurag Vyas as Monil Singhania: Pawan's son, Ponky and Daksh's brother, Veer's cousin.
Suchit Vikram as Daksh Singhania: Pawan's son, Monil and Ponky's brother, Veer's cousin.
Swarda Thigale as Mayuri: A shape-shifting peafowl, Veer's friend and Ponky's fiancée.
Karan Taneja as Sunny: Mayuri's friend.
Shivanshu Sharma as Bobby: Mayuri's assistant and Sunny's friend.
Kamal Malik as Pandit: Lord Shiva's source.
Shreyas Pandit as Mahaguru: Lord Shiva's source.
Manorama Bhattishyam as Panditayan: Lord Shiva's source, Pandit's wife.
Priyamvada Kant as Chandani: Princess of the moon. She hypnotised Veer to come to Moon and marry her, but was unsuccessful later.
Arjit Taneja as Farishta: An angel who wants Bani to take revenge from the cheels, he tried to kill Veer, but later realises their true love and leaves.
Ami Neema as Monika: A girl appointed by Jay to seduce Veer.

Guest
Surbhi Jyoti as Bela/Shravani: Naagrani of Sheshnaag clan.
Nia Sharma as Brinda: A naagin from Sheshnaag clan.
Vijayendra Kumeria as Dev Parekh: Brinda's husband.
Hina Khan as Naageshwari: Sarvashreshth Aadi Naagin, the first and the most powerful Naagin, Hriday's lover, Aakesh's obsession.
Mohit Malhotra as Hriday: Aadi Naag, Naageshwari's love interest.
Dheeraj Dhoopar as 
Akesh: Prince of cheels, Naageshwari's obsessive lover.
Shakura: A shapeshifting cheel. Akesh/Veer's Doppelganger.

Basant Panchami Special
This is a standalone promotional episodes aired on 5 & 6 February 2022.
Pearl V Puri as Mihir
Surbhi Chandna as Bani
Adaa Khan as Shesha
Anita Hassanandani as Vishakha
Krishna Mukherjee as Priya
Amrapali Gupta as Rani Trilok Sundari

Season 6

Main
Tejasswi Prakash as
Pratha Rishabh Gujral: Former Sarvashreshth Shesh Naagin from Vasuki Clan, Roopa and Shivaan's younger daughter, Mahek's younger sister, Arjun's elder sister, Rishabh's wife, Prathna's mother, Anmol's foster mother, Meher and Purvika's grandmother.
Prathna Raghuveer Ahlawat: Sarvashreshth Maha Shesh Naagin from Vasuki Clan, Pratha and Rishabh's daughter; Professor Jeet's foster daughter; Rudra's love interest, Raghuveer's wife, Meher and Purvika's mother.
Simba Nagpal as
Rishabh Gujral: An army officer who later becomes a businessman, Chanda and Lalit's son, Shakti's twin brother, Ritesh and Sheena's half-brother, Pratha's husband, Mahek's ex-husband, Prathna's father, Anmol's foster father, Meher and Purvika's grandfather.
Amaan Aziz as Young Rishabh
Shakti Gujral: Chanda and Lalit's son, Rishabh's twin brother, Ritesh's and Sheena's half-brother One of the five betrayers.
Amaan Aziz as Young Shakti
Mahek Chahal as Mahek Ahlawat: A Naagin from Vasuki Clan, Roopa and Shivaan's elder daughter, Pratha and Arjun's elder sister, Rishabh and Yash's ex-wife, Vinay's widow.
Shrey Mittal as Raghuveer Ahlawat: Sarvashresth Shesh Naag, Yash's son, Mrignayni and Swarna's brother, Vinay and Sonia's adopted brother, Prathna's husband, Meher and Purvika's father.

Recurring
Sudha Chandran as
Seema Gujral: Maha Asur from Kalkeya Clan, Yamini's reincarnation, Pataali's daughter, Lalit's second wife, Rishabh and Shakti's stepmother, Jeet, Rainaksh, Rithesh, and Sheena's mother.
Pataali: An Asur from Kalkeya Clan, Puloma's daughter, Seema's Mother, Jeet's grandmother, Anmol's great-grandmother, Urvashi's cousin.
Bharathi Sharma As Kadru/Naageshwari: Former Sarvashreshth Shesh Naagin from Vasuki Clan, Puloma's sister, Roopa and Urvashi's mother, Pratha, Mahek, Arjun, Reem, and Rhea's grandmother, Prathna's great grandmother, Pataali's maternal aunt, Seema's maternal grandmother, Anmol's maternal great great grandmother
Fatimah Begum as Pulooma.Former Queen of Kalkeya Clan, Naageshwari's sister, Pataali's mother, Seema's grandmother, Rithesh, Jeet, Sheena's great grandmother, Anmol great great grandmother, Roopa and Urvashi's maternal aunt, Pratha, Mahek, Arjun, Reem and Rhea's maternal grandmother, Prathna's maternal great grandmother.
Yash Pandit as Vinay Ahlawat: A businessman, Raghuveer, and Sonia's brother, Mahek's husband.
Gautam Ahuja as Gautam: Prathna's foster brother, Sonia's husband.
Rushitaa Vaidya as Sonia Ahlawat: Raghuveer and Vinay's sister, Gautam's wife.
Urvashi Dholakia as Urvashi Kataria: A cursed naagin from the Vasuki Clan, Naageshwari's younger daughter, Roopa's younger sister, Pratha, Arjun and Mahek's maternal aunt, Ankush's ex-wife, Reem and Rhea's mother, Sayali's grandmother.
Manit Joura as Professor Jeet Patel: Seema's son, Anmol's father, and Prathna's foster father.
Amandeep Sidhu as Anmol Patel: An Asur from Kalkeya Clan, Professor Jeet's daughter, Rishabh and Pratha's foster daughter.
 Pratik Sehajpal as Rudra Raichand: Sanjana and Ranjit's son, Anmol's childhood friend, Prathna's love interest.
Tusharr Khanna as Yash: Former Sarvashreshth Shesh Naag, Pratha's destined husband, Samaira's elder brother, Mahek's ex-husband, Raghu, Mrignayni and Swarna's father.
Ajay Sharma as Naagraj Takshak: King of the Takshak snake clan, Pratha and Prathna’s mentor
Vishal Solanki as Rajesh Pratap Singh: Pratha's fake husband, Divya's elder brother, and Rithvik's father.
Bakul Thakkar as Lalit Gujral: Chanda and Seema's husband, Rishabh, Shakti, Ritesh & Sheena's father, one of the twenty conspirators, now he turns good.
Sneha Raikar as Chanda Gujral: Lalit's wife, Rishabh, and Shakti's biological mother.
Abhishek Verma as Ritesh Gujral: Rishabh and Shakti's younger brother, Seema and Lalit's son, Sheena's elder brother, Rhea and Pratha's ex-fiancé, Rehaan and Vihaan's cousin, Reem's husband, Sayali's father.
Gayathiri Iyer as Reem Kataria Gujral: Urvashi and Ankush's elder daughter, Rhea's elder sister, Pratha, Mahek, Arjun's cousin, Roopa and Shivansh's elder niece, Rishabh's ex-fiancée, Ritesh's wife, Sayali's mother.
Jeyabhuben as Arjun/Varun Nair: Sarvashreshth Raj Naag from Vasuki Clan, Shivansh and Roopa's younger son, Mahek, and Pratha's younger brother.
Reema Worah as Radha Gujral: Puneet's Wife, Vihaan, and Rehan's Mother.
Shoaib Ali as Vihaan Gujral: Puneet and Radha's elder son, Rehaan's elder brother, Rishabh, Shakti, Ritesh, and Sheena's cousin brother.
Pranav Kumar / Vishesh Sharma as Rehan Gujral: Puneet and Radha's younger son, Vihaan's younger brother, Rishabh, Shakti, Ritesh and Sheena's cousin brother, Samaira's ex-husband,
Nupur Dhariwal as Sheena Gujral: Seema and Lalit's daughter, Rishabh and Shakti's younger half-sister, and Ritesh's younger sister, Rehaan, Vihaan, and Ananya's cousin.
Srushti Tare as Ananya Gujral: Seema's maternal niece, Rishabh, Shakti, Ritesh, Sheena, Rehan, and Vihaan's cousin sister.
Abeer Singh Godhwani as Vijay Shukla: An inspector, Mahek's love interest.
Nandani Tiwary as Divya: Rajesh's younger sister.
Priti Gandwani as Roopa: A Naagin from Vasuki clan, Naageshwari's elder daughter, Urvashi's sister, Shivaan's wife, Pratha, Mahek, and Arjun's mother.
Amit Singh Thakur as Shivansh: Roopa's husband, Urvashi's love interest, Pratha, Mahek, and Arjun's father, one of the twenty conspirators a.k.a. The Mastermind.
Lokesh Tilakdhari as Ankush Kataria: A minister, Urvashi's husband, Reem and Rhea's father, one of the twenty conspirators.
Aditi Shetty as Rhea Kataria: Urvashi and Ankush's younger daughter, Reem's younger sister, Ritesh's ex-fiancée.
Pratibha Pooghat as Samaira: Yash's younger sister, Rehan's ex-wife.
Ashish Trivedi as Mayank: Pratha's ex-fiancée.
Shivam Singh as an army officer, Rishabh's friend.
Ravi Chhabra as an army officer, Rishabh's friend.
Shivani Jha as Mrignayni: A naagin princess, Yash's daughter, Raghu's sister.
Poulomi Das as Swarna: A naagin princess, Yash's daughter, Raghu's sister.
Aashvi Bisht as Naina: Prathna's sister.
Lokesh Batta as Professor Prashant, Jeet's disciple.
Srikant Dwivedi as Anantnag: Sheshnaag Yash's brother, Raghu, Mrignayni and Swarna's uncle.
Aarohi M Kumawat as Purvika: Prathna and Raghuveer's daughter, Meher's twin sister.
Kevina Tak as Meher: Prathna and Raghuveer's daughter, Purvika's twin sister, Manjit Singh and Manjit Kaur's foster daughter, Ballu's adoptive sister.
Sheeba Akashdeep as Manjeet Kaur: Manjit Singh's wife, Ballu's mother, Meher's foster mother.
Digvijay Purohit as Manjit Singh: Manjeet Kaur's husband, Ballu's father, Meher's foster father.
Vaishnavi Ganatra as Tina: Prathna’s sister.

Guest
Adaa Khan as Shesha: A naagin from Kaal Kuth clan. 
Anita Hassanandani as Vishakha: A naagin from Kaal Kuth clan.
Arjit Taneja/Akash Jagga as Farishta: An angel
Rashami Desai as
Shanglira: Vish Naagin, artificially created in the laboratory of Changistan, Shalaka's doppelganger, was killed by Shalaka.
Shalaka: A human who became a naagin after strict penance, she has been liberated from her sins for stealing the Naagmani by the grace of Shesh Naagin.
Shikha Singh as Riddhi Sharma: A police officer, one of twenty conspirators.
Sanjay Gagnani as Mahasapera.
Zeeshan Khan as Rainaksh: A shape-shifting mongoose, Seema and Bhanu's son.
Nitin Bhatia as Bhanu: A shape-shifting mongoose, Seema's ex-husband, Rainaksh's father.
Arjun Kapoor to promote his film Ek Villain Returns.
 Kritika Singh Yadav as Pratiksha Parekh: to promote Pyar Ke Saat Vachan Dharampatnii.
 Tusshar Kapoor to promote his film Maarrich.

Reception
In its launch week, the series topped the ratings charts. Season One proved to be highly successful.

The second season also topped the ratings chart in its launch week and continued to do so.

Like the first 2 seasons, the third season also topped the ratings chart in its launch week and continued to do so for several months. But when the 3rd season was extended in January 2019, the season lost its top position in the TRP charts and even went out of the top 5 shows for several months but regained its top position in the last week.

The fourth season topped the rating charts for 2 months and later managed to remain in top 5 shows. However, because of the lockdown, the season's original story was scrapped and it had to wrap up within 8 episodes post lockdown since it was not as successful like the previous seasons.

Unlike previous seasons which consistently maintained its positions in top 5, season 5 since its respective third week of telecast, wasn't able to enter the top 5 Hindi GEC while its ratings dropped weekly. The ratings of the season dropped to an all-time low.

The sixth season had a successful 2 months, but later on, met with slight fluctuations in ratings due to time slot changes. It got multiple extensions due to its success and became the longest-running season of the franchise

Rating

Season 2
In the table below, the blue numbers represent the lowest ratings and the red numbers represent the highest ratings.

Season 3
In the table below, the blue numbers represent the lowest ratings and the red numbers represent the highest ratings.

Season 4
In the table below, the blue numbers represent the lowest ratings and the red numbers represent the highest ratings.

Season 5
In the table below, the blue numbers represent the lowest ratings and the red numbers represent the highest ratings.

Unlike previous seasons which consistently maintained its positions in top 5, season 5 since its third week of telecast could not be able to enter top 5 Hindi GEC while its ratings dropped weekly.

Season 6
In the table below, the blue numbers represent the lowest ratings and the red numbers represent the highest ratings.

Soundtrack

Awards and nominations

References

External links

Balaji Telefilms television series
2015 Indian television series debuts
Indian fantasy television series
Indian drama television series
Colors TV original programming
Hindi-language television shows
Television shows set in Mumbai
Television shows set in Rajasthan
Television series about snakes
Television series about shapeshifting